Caribachlamys is a genus of molluscs in the family Pectinidae.

Species
 Caribachlamys imbricata (Gmelin, 1791) — Little knobby scallop
 Caribachlamys ornata (Lamarck, 1819) — Ornate scallop
 Caribachlamys sentis (Reeve, 1853) — Sentis scallop

References

Pectinidae
Bivalve genera